"My Boy" is the title of the seventh single by the Hello! Project unit Buono!. The title song is the third song used for the ending theme of Shugo Chara!! Doki—.

The single was released on April 29, 2009 in Japan under the Pony Canyon label in two different versions: regular and limited.

The Single V version was released on May 13, 2009

Track listing

CD 
 MY BOY
 Warp
 MY BOY (Instrumental)
 Warp (Instrumental)

Single V DVD 
 "MY BOY <Music Clip>"
 "MY BOY <Close Up Version>"
 Y <Dance Shot VersصاوءخعةرءصصشضسساغنزورترنلورdhnkvnPV"|PV撮影メイキング}}

References

External links 
 "MY BOY" entries on the Hello! Project official website: CD, Single V DVD 

2009 singles
Shugo Chara!
Buono! songs
Song recordings produced by Tsunku
2009 songs
Pony Canyon singles